Cerconota hexascia is a moth of the family Depressariidae. It is found in Brazil (Amazonas).

References

Moths described in 1925
Cerconota
Taxa named by Edward Meyrick